In radio, and wireless communications in general, blocking is a condition in a receiver in which an off-frequency signal (generally further off-frequency than the immediately adjacent channel) causes the signal of interest to be suppressed.

Blocking rejection is the ability of a receiver to tolerate an off-frequency signal and avoid blocking. A good automatic gain control design is part of achieving good blocking rejection.

References

Radio technology